Ping Long is a village in Lam Tsuen, Tai Po District, Hong Kong.

Administration
Ping Long is a recognized village under the New Territories Small House Policy.

See also
 San Tong, a village adjecent to Ping Long, located to its northeast
 Tai Om, a village adjecent to Ping Long, located to its south

References

External links

 Delineation of area of existing village Ping Long (Tai Po) for election of resident representative (2019 to 2022)
 Antiquities Advisory Board. Historic Building Appraisal. Pictures of Chung Ancestral Hall, No. 21 Ping Long, Tai Po
 Antiquities Advisory Board. Historic Building Appraisal. Chung Ancestral Hall, No. 36 Ping Long, Tai Po Pictures

Villages in Tai Po District, Hong Kong
Lam Tsuen